

Wilhelm Wegener (29 April 1895 – 24 September 1944) was a German general of infantry, serving during World War II. He was also a recipient of the Knight's Cross of the Iron Cross with Oak Leaves and Swords. He was killed in action by the Red Army air attack aircraft on 24 September 1944. His demise was announced by Berlin radio on 26 September 1944, stating that he “met a hero’s death” on the Eastern Front.

Awards

 Clasp to the Iron Cross (1939) 2nd Class (26 September 1939) & 1st Class (29 May 1940)
 Knight's Cross of the Iron Cross with Oak Leaves and Swords
 Knight's Cross on 27 October 1941 as Oberst and commander of Infanterie-Regiment 94
 66th Oak Leaves on 19 January 1942 as Oberst and commander of Infanterie-Regiment 94
 97th Swords on 17 September 1944 as General der Infanterie and commanding general of the L. Armeekorps

References

Citations

Bibliography

 
 

1895 births
1944 deaths
German Army personnel of World War I
Recipients of the clasp to the Iron Cross, 1st class
Generals of Infantry (Wehrmacht)
German Army personnel killed in World War II
People from the Province of Brandenburg
Recipients of the Knight's Cross of the Iron Cross with Oak Leaves and Swords
Reichswehr personnel
Deaths by airstrike during World War II
Military personnel from Brandenburg
German Army generals of World War II
People from Beeskow